The Lola T92/00 is a highly successful open-wheel racing car chassis, designed and built by Lola Cars that competed in the CART open-wheel racing series, for competition in the 1992 IndyCar season. It was extremely competitive, winning 10 out of the 16 races that season, and clinching 14 total pole positions, including the opening round in Australia, and the special Marlboro Challenge event at Nazareth. It was mainly powered by the  Ford/Cosworth XB turbo engine, but some also used the Ilmor-Chevrolet 265-A V8 turbo engine, or the Buick Indy V6 turbo engine with this chassis. It powered Bobby Rahal to his third and final IndyCar World Drivers' Championship.

References 

Open wheel racing cars
American Championship racing cars
Lola racing cars